João Gomes Bridge is a bridge in Funchal, the capital city of the Portuguese island of Madeira. It forms part of the VR1, Madeira.

It was completed in 1994 and was designed by engineer António José Luís dos Reis. It is 274.5 metres long and stands high at 140 metres.

See also
List of bridges in Portugal

External links
Ponte João Gomes

Bridges in Madeira
Transport in Madeira
Bridges completed in 1994
1994 establishments in Portugal